Lt. Col. Samuel Mathews (1630–1660), Commonwealth Governor of Virginia, of Warwick County in the English Colony of Virginia, was a member of the House of Burgesses, the Governor's Council, and served as Commonwealth Governor of Virginia from 1656 until he died in office in January, 1660 (1659 A.S.).  There was no Royal Governorship at the time of the "Protectorate", and the Governor technically answered to the Cromwellian Parliament, although Royalist sentiment was prevalent in the colony of Virginia at this time. The former Royalist governor Berkeley arrived to replace him March 13, 1660.

Biography
Samuel Mathews (Jr.) was the elder son of Samuel Matthews (Sr.) (1572-1657) and Frances Grevill West Peirsey Mathews (1590-1635). He was born at his father's plantation, Mathews Manor, later known as Denbigh, which was located on the north side of the James River at Blunt Point, the confluence of the Warwick and the James rivers in the area which later became Warwick County, Virginia (and which is now within the city limits of Newport News).

The elder Samuel Mathews was the first of the Mathews family to emigrate from England to Virginia, arriving at Jamestown by 1619. He eventually had several other land holdings, including one near Henricus and another at Old Point Comfort. Known as Colonel Mathews, the elder Samuel became one of the most prominent men in the colony. He was a member of the Governor's Council and was actively involved in conflicts with the Native Americans. In 1635, he was one of the leaders of the popular mutiny that ousted Royal Governor Sir John Harvey. Upon returning to England, the elder Mathews was eventually cleared of any charges; upon returning to Virginia, he resumed service on the Governor's Council until 1644.

Frances Grevill was one of four women who arrived at Jamestown from Bristol, England in September 1620 aboard the ship, Supply. She was first married to Captain Nathaniel West, brother of Thomas West, the third Lord Delaware, who had been governor of Virginia beginning in 1610. After West's death several years later, Grevill married Abraham Peirsey, a wealthy man who had purchased Sir George Yeardley's Flowerdew Hundred Plantation after his death. Peirsey died several years later. Twice widowed, but with considerable legacies, she next married Samuel Mathews.

The younger Samuel Mathews, as an adult, was known as Lt. Colonel Samuel Mathews, reflecting his standing in the local militia. In 1652, he was named to the representative House of Burgesses, which was the lower house of the legislature, on behalf of Warwick County. In 1656, he was appointed to the upper house, the Governor's Council, and later that year, became the Commonwealth Governor of Virginia, a position held until his death in January 1660.

In April 1658, mainly to signal their displeasure with Oliver Cromwell, the Burgesses ceremonially dismissed him and reelected him in a single Act. Because of his loyalty, as governor, to Cromwell, he was often assumed to be a Puritan himself, although in fact he had been known as a persecutor of the Puritan sect in Virginia in the days before Cromwell.

In January 1660, shortly before the English Restoration, Matthews died in office, and the Burgesses at that point simply reinstated the former Royalist Governor, William Berkeley by unanimous vote. Thus, in the view of historian Robert Beverley, Jr. writing in 1705, Virginia colony "was the last of all the King's Dominions that submitted to the Usurpation, and afterwards the first that cast it off."

His brother Francis (1632-1673) outlived him. Governor Mathews married about 1655, but little information is known about his wife, other than some sources state she was of the Cole-Digges family. They had one son, John (b. 1659 - May 1, 1706) who married Elizabeth Tavernor on March 24, 1684. John also made his home at the Denbigh Plantation in Warwick County.

Legacy
The site of Mathews Manor, located within the independent city of Newport News, Virginia, was the subject of an archeological study led by Colonial Williamsburg's Ivor Noel Hume in the 1960s, and was placed on the National Park Service's National Register of Historic Places.

Further reading
 ANTIQUES, Dec 1966, Mathews Manor, Ivor Noel Hume, p 832.
 Adventures of Purse and Person, 1607-1624/5, Revised and Edited by Virginia M Meyer (1974-1981), John Frederick Dorman, F.A.S.G. 1981–1987, Pub by Order of First Families of Virginia, 1607-1624/5, 3rd Edition, 1987, Dietz Press, Inc, Richmond, VA.
 Genealogies of Virginia Families For the William & Mary College Quarterly Historical Magazine, Vol III, Gen Pub Co, Baltimore.
 Biographical Directory of American Colonial and Revolutionary Governors 1607–1789, John W Raimo, Meckler Books, A Division of Microform Review, 520 Riverside Ave., Westport, CT 06880
 Gone to Texas, W Wayne Rogers, Bloomington, Ill, 1978

References

External links
Mathews Manor site

1630 births
1660 deaths
Colonial governors of Virginia
People from Warwick County, Virginia
British North American Anglicans
Mathews family of Virginia and West Virginia
Virginia Governor's Council members